Strnad is predominantly Czech (feminine Strnadová) and  Slovenian  surname (eng. bird Yellowhammer, Bunting) [biol. Emberiza] spread also to Slovakia, Croatia, Austria, Germany, and USA. In the USA the Slovenian version is written as Sternot. Notable people with the surname include:
 Andrea Strnadová, Czech tennis player
 Jan Strnad, American writer
 Jana Strnadová, Czech tennis player
 Janez Strnad, Slovene physicist
 Johann Strnad, Austrian footballer
 Justin Strnad (born 1996), American football player
 Marica Strnad Cizelj, Slovenian teacher, poet, feminist
 Martin Strnad, Czech sport shooter
 Michaela Strnadová-Mrůzková, Czech canoer
 Milena Strnadová, Czech athlete
 Miloslav Strnad, Czech footballer
 Nina Strnad, Slovenian jazz singer
 Oskar Strnad, Austrian architect
 Rado Strnad, Slovenian geologist
 Stanislav Strnad, Czech film director
 Tone Strnad, Slovenian businessman
 Tomáš Strnad, Czech footballer
 Trevor Strnad, vocalist of heavy metal band The Black Dahlia Murder
 Valerija Strnad, first Slovenian feminine medical doctor
 Zvonko Strnad, Croatian footballer
 6281 Strnad, asteroid

Czech-language surnames